Amirkhan may refer to:
 Amirkhan, Iran, a village in North Khorasan Province, Iran
 Fatix Ämirxan (1886–1926), Tatar writer